Query Island is a prominent rocky island lying between the foot of Clarke Glacier and Keyhole Island on the south side of Mikkelsen Bay, off the west coast of Graham Land. Surveyed in 1948 by the Falkland Islands Dependencies Survey (FIDS), it was so named because of the difficulty in deciding from a distance whether the feature was an island or part of the mainland.

See also 
 List of Antarctic and sub-Antarctic islands

Islands of Graham Land
Fallières Coast